SACN can mean
 South American Community of Nations, a former customs union
 Scientific Advisory Committee on Nutrition, a United Kingdom government body
 Streaming Architecture for Control Networks, a technology standard in the entertainment industry